Matthew K. Nock is an American clinical psychologist, the Edgar Pierce Professor of Psychology, and the Director of the Laboratory for Clinical and Developmental Research at Harvard University (Nock Lab). He was named a 2011 MacArthur Fellow.

Research
Nock's research is aimed at understanding why people behave in ways that are harmful to themselves, with an emphasis on suicide and other forms of self-harm.  
His research is multi-disciplinary in nature and uses a range of methodological approaches (e.g., epidemiologic surveys, laboratory-based experiments, and clinic-based studies) to better understand how these behaviors develop, how to predict them, and how to prevent their occurrence.  This work is funded by grants from the National Institutes of Health and several private foundations, has been published in over 250 scientific papers and book chapters. 
Nock's work has been recognized through the receipt of four early career awards from the American Psychological Association, the Association for Behavioral and Cognitive Therapies, and the American Association of Suicidology; and in 2011 he was named a MacArthur Fellow.  
In addition to conducting research, Nock has been a consultant/scientific advisor to the National Institutes of Health, the World Health Organization's World Mental Health Survey Initiative, the American Psychological Association, and the American Psychiatric Association DSM-V Childhood and Adolescent Disorder Work Group.  
At Harvard, Professor Nock teaches courses on statistics, research methods, self-destructive behaviors, developmental psychopathology, and cultural diversity—for which he has received several teaching awards including the Roslyn Abramson Teaching Award, Lawrence H. Cohen Outstanding Mentor Award, and the Petra Shattuck Prize.

Life
Nock was born and raised in New Jersey. He received a bachelor's degree from Boston University, two master's degrees and a PhD in psychology from Yale University, and completed a clinical psychology internship at Bellevue Hospital Center and NYU Child Study Center. He currently is a professor of Psychology and Director of the Nock Lab in the Department of Psychology at Harvard University.

References

External links

 A Tragedy and a Mystery: Understanding suicide and self-injury from Harvard Magazine
 Nock Lab at Harvard.

Year of birth missing (living people)
Living people
21st-century American psychologists
MacArthur Fellows
Boston University alumni
Yale University alumni
Harvard University faculty
New York University people
New York University faculty